The 1962 San Francisco 49ers season was the franchise's 13th season in the National Football League and their 17th overall. The 49ers went 6–8 that season, finishing in fifth place in the NFL Western Conference. With their first round draft pick, the 49ers drafted Lance Alworth but he opted for the San Diego Chargers of the rival American Football League. This was the first season that the famous "S.F." oval logo appeared on the helmets.

Offseason

NFL Draft

Schedule

Season summary

Week 1 vs Bears

Standings

Awards and records

References

External links 
 1962 49ers on Pro Football Reference
 49ers Schedule on jt-sw.com

San Francisco 49ers
San Francisco 49ers seasons
San Francisco 49ers
San Fran 49